The 2009–10 Luxembourg Cup was the 85th season of Luxembourg's annual cup competition. It began on 2 September 2009 with Round 1 and ended on 30 May 2010 with the Final held at a neutral venue. The winners of the competition qualified for the second qualifying round of the 2010–11 UEFA Europa League. F91 Dudelange were the defending champions, having won their fourth cup title last season.

Round 1
Fifty-one teams from Division 2 (IV) and Division 3 (V) entered in this round. Thirty-eight of them competed in matches, with the other thirteen teams were awarded a bye. The games were played on September 2, 2009.

Bye: Blo Weiss Itzig, US Boevange, Claravallis Clervaux, FC Kopstal, Luna Oberkorn, AS Luxembourg-Porto, Olympia Christnach, Orania Vianden, FC Pratzerthal/Rédange, US Reisdorf, AS Remich, FC Schifflange 95, Yellow Boys Weiler

Round 2
The winners of Round 1 and those teams that got a bye competed in this round. The games were played on September 27, 2009.

Round 3
The sixteen winners of Round 2 competed in this round, as well as twenty-eight teams from Division 1 (III), which entered the competition in this round. The games were played on 29, 30 and 31 October 2009.

Round 4
Twenty-two winners of Round 3 competed in this round, as well as fourteen teams from the Division of Honour (II), which entered the competition in this round. The games were played on 3, 4, 5 and 6 December 2009.

Round 5
Eighteen winners of Round 4 competed in this round, as well as fourteen teams from the National Division, which entered the competition in this round. The games were played on 26, 27 and 28 February 2010.

Round 6
The winners of Round 5 competed in this round. The games were played on 3 April 2010.

Quarterfinals

Semifinals

Final

External links
 Official page 
 Private homepage about everything regarding Luxembourg soccer 

Luxembourg Cup seasons
Luxembourg Cup
Cup